Ferenc Mező, also known as Grünfeld (March 13, 1885 – November 21, 1961), was a Hungarian poet. He was born in Pölöskefő, Zala County, and died in Budapest. In 1928, he won a gold medal in the art competitions of the Olympic Games for his "History of the Olympic Games".

References

Further reading
 Reményi Gyenes István: Ismerjük őket? Zsidó származású nevezetes magyarok (Ex Libris Kiadó, Budapest, 2000)

External links
 Magyar Életrajzi Lexikon 1000-1990: Mező Ferenc, Grünfeld 
 Életrajza a MOB honlapján 

1885 births
1961 deaths
20th-century Hungarian poets
Hungarian male poets
Olympic gold medalists in art competitions
International Olympic Committee members
Medalists at the 1928 Summer Olympics
20th-century Hungarian male writers
Olympic competitors in art competitions